The 1937–47 Nordic Football Championship was the fourth Nordic Football Championship staged. Four Nordic countries participated, Denmark, Finland, Norway and Sweden. The tournament was arranged by the Football Association of Finland. The trophy was named Suomen Karhut (Finnish Bears). The tournament which was originally supposed to end in 1940, but the Second World War interrupted it and the last six matches were not played until 1947.

Results

1937

1938

1939

1947

Table

Winners

Statistics

Goalscorers

See also
Balkan CupBaltic CupCentral European International CupMediterranean Cup

References

External links 
Nordic Championships 1937-47 at RSSSF

1937-47
1937–38 in European football
1938–39 in European football
1939–40 in European football
1947–48 in European football
1937–38 in Swedish football
1938–39 in Swedish football
1939–40 in Swedish football
1947–48 in Swedish football
1937–38 in Danish football
1938–39 in Danish football
1939–40 in Danish football
1947–48 in Danish football
1937 in Norwegian football
1938 in Norwegian football
1939 in Norwegian football
1947 in Norwegian football
1937 in Finnish football
1938 in Finnish football
1939 in Finnish football
1947 in Finnish football